1818 Brahms, provisional designation , is an asteroid from the inner regions of the asteroid belt, approximately 6 kilometers in diameter. It was discovered on 15 August 1939, by German astronomer Karl Reinmuth at Heidelberg Observatory in southern Germany. The asteroid was named after composer Johannes Brahms.

Orbit and classification 

Brahms orbits the Sun in the inner main-belt at a distance of 1.8–2.6 AU once every 3 years and 2 months (1,163 days). Its orbit has an eccentricity of 0.18 and an inclination of 3° with respect to the ecliptic.

Physical characteristics 

As of 2017, Brahms effective size, albedo and spectral type, as well as its rotation period and shape remain unknown. Based on a magnitude-to-diameter conversion, its generic diameter is between 5 and 11 kilometer for an absolute magnitude of 13.8, and an assumed albedo in the range of 0.05 to 0.25. Since asteroids in the inner main-belt are typically of stony rather than carbonaceous composition, with albedos of 0.20 or higher, Brahmss diameter can be estimate to measure around 6 kilometers, as the higher its albedo (reflectivity), the lower the body's diameter at a constant absolute magnitude (brightness).

Naming 

This minor planet is named for the German composer Johannes Brahms (1833–1897). The official  was published by the Minor Planet Center on 20 February 1976.

References

External links 
 Asteroid Lightcurve Database (LCDB), query form (info )
 Dictionary of Minor Planet Names, Google books
 Asteroids and comets rotation curves, CdR – Observatoire de Genève, Raoul Behrend
 Discovery Circumstances: Numbered Minor Planets (1)-(5000) – Minor Planet Center
 
 

001818
Johannes Brahms
Discoveries by Karl Wilhelm Reinmuth
Named minor planets
19390815